KB (Kailash Bahl) DAV Senior Secondary Public School is a co-educational  secondary school in Chandigarh (Sector 7), India. It is a private school affiliated to India's Central Board of Secondary Education (CBSE) and a member school of the DAV Society, India's largest non-governmental educational body. In Classes 11 and 12, the school offers courses in Science (both medical and Non-medical) and Commerce. English is a compulsory core subject for all students.

The school was started in 1994 with four classrooms and 70 students. As of 2008, it had 60 classrooms and an enrollment of 2000 students. Its facilities include a science block and computer lab, an 8000 book library, and an indoor speed skating rink.

Students and teachers are affiliated to one of four 'houses' – Jasmine, Lotus, Rose and Tulip. House activities include an annual performance involving both students and their teachers at the school's Guru Pratibha Day celebrations.

The school's founder is Madhu Bahl.

See also
Education in India
Literacy in India
List of institutions of higher education in Punjab, India

References

External links
Official website
Official website of the DAV Society

Educational institutions established in 1994
High schools and secondary schools in Chandigarh
Schools affiliated with the Arya Samaj
1994 establishments in Chandigarh